Lebd may refer to:
 Lebd-e Olya
 Lebd-e Sofla